Ye Duzheng (21 February 1916 – 16 October 2013) was a Chinese meteorologist and academician at the Chinese Academy of Sciences.

Born in Anqing, Anhui province in 1916, Ye is considered the founder of Chinese atmospheric physics, and was awarded the State Preeminent Science and Technology Award in 2005 by Chinese President Hu Jintao, which is the nation's highest scientific prize.

Career
From 1935–1941, Ye studied at Tsinghua University, Beijing. From 1941–1943, he did his graduate study (M.Sc) at Zhejiang University, Hangzhou. From 1943–1944, he was a research assistant at the Meteorological Institute, Academia Sinica, Chongqing (war-period capital of China).

In 1945–1948, Ye studied at University of Chicago, and obtained his PhD there (under Carl-Gustaf Rossby). From 1947–1950, he was a researcher at University of Chicago. From 1950–1966, he served as a division director and professor at the Institute of Geophysics, Chinese Academy of Sciences.

From 1966 until his death, he was the chief director and later the honorary director of the Institute of Atmospheric Physics, Chinese Academy of Science (IAP/CAS). In 1981–1984, he was the vice-president of Chinese Academy of Science. From 1984 till his death, he was also an advisor of Chinese Academy of Science.

In 1978–1986, Ye was the president of Chinese Meteorological Society. In 1982–1988, he was the chairman of the Chinese National Committee for the World Climate Research Programme (WCRP). In 1987–1991, he was the chairman of the Chinese National Committee for International Union of Geodesy and Geophysics (IUGG). In 1987–1993, he was the chairman of the Chinese National Committee for the International Geosphere-Biosphere Programme (IGBP).

He died on 16 October 2013.

Membership
 1980, Member, Chinese Academy of Science
 1981, Foreign Member, Finnish Academy of Science and Letters, Finland
 1982, Honorary Member, Royal Meteorological Society, UK
 1990, Honorary Member, American Meteorological Society, USA
 1982-1988, Member, Joint Scientific Committee/World Climate Research Programme (JSC/WCRP)
 1983-1987, Member, International Association of Meteorology and Atmospheric Physics (IAMAP) Executive Committee
 1987-1990, Member, International Geosphere-Biosphere Programme (SC-IGBP)
 1987-1995, Member, International Union of Geodesy and Geophysics (IUGG) Bureau

Honours and awards
2003 Awarded the International Meteorological Organization Prize from the World Meteorological Organization.

References

1916 births
2013 deaths
Chinese meteorologists
Members of the Chinese Academy of Sciences
Members of the Finnish Academy of Science and Letters
National Southwestern Associated University alumni
Scientists from Tianjin
Tsinghua University alumni
Zhejiang University alumni
Delegates to the 3rd National People's Congress
Delegates to the 5th National People's Congress
Members of the Standing Committee of the 7th National People's Congress